The 1977 Speedway World Team Cup was the 18th edition of the FIM Speedway World Team Cup to determine the team world champions.

The final took place at the Stadion Olimpijski (Wrocław) in Poland. England bounced back to winning ways by recording a record seventh title success. England exacted revenge on defending champions Australia by knocking them out in the British qualifying round.

Qualification

British Round
 June 19
  Reading, Reading Stadium
 Referee:  C Bergstrom

* England to Final

Scandinavian Round
 June 19
  Skien

* Sweden to Final

Continental Qualifying Round
 May 21
  Landshut, Ellermühle Stadium

* West Germany and Nederlands to Continental Semifinal

Continental Qualifying Round
 May 22
  Osijek

* Czechoslovakia and Bulgaria to Continental Semifinal

Tournament

Continental Semifinal
 May 22
  Miskolc

* Czechoslovakia and West Germany to Continental Final

Continental Final
 July 9
  Prague, Marketa Stadium
 Att: 12,000

* Czechoslovakia and Poland to Final

World Final
 September 18
  Wrocław Olympic Stadium
 Att: 55,000

See also
 1977 Individual Speedway World Championship
 1977 Speedway World Pairs Championship

References

1977
World T